Miss Earth Kazakhstan is a national beauty pageant in Kazakhstan that selects women to compete in Miss Earth pageant.

Kazakhstan
Beauty pageants in Kazakhstan
2001 establishments in Kazakhstan